Ronald 'Ron' Tree (born 8 April 1963 in Leeds, England) is an English musician and songwriter, best known as frontman and bassist for the English space rock band Hawkwind from 1995 to 2002.  He also played both these roles in the reunited Steve Took's Horns in 2002, taking the place of Steve Peregrin Took. He later became the vocalist/songwriter in the Hawklords, alongside Jerry Richards, Harvey Bainbridge, Dave Pearce and Tom Ashurst.

History
Prior to joining Hawkwind, Tree played with 2000DS, Plato's Jacuzzi, Captain Jesus and the Sunray Dream (who released two limited-edition "private press" LPs), and his own band, Bastard. He contributed vocals and bass to Bajina in 2000, with Dino Ferari (drums) and Judge Trev Thoms (lead guitar), and, also with Ferari and Judge Trev, recorded two new tracks for the Steve Took's Horns album Blow It!!!, the main body of which was recorded in 1977 at Pathway Studios, London, by Took with Trev and Ferari; that album was released 10 August 2004. After these musical excursions he contributed vocals and bass for Trev (lead guitar & vocals), Jim Hawkman (synthesizer), and John Morgan (drums) with Mother Of All Bands (M.O.A.B.).

Since then, amongst other various musical projects, he has played with Leeds-based band The Sewer Suckers, who supported bands such as My Older Ego in his home town.  Hawklords have annually released an album, namely; We Are One (2012), Dream (2013), Censored (2014), Re:volution (2015), Fusion (2016) and Six (2017); although Tree did not appear on the latter.

References

External links

1963 births
Living people
musicians from Leeds
English rock bass guitarists
Male bass guitarists
English male singers
Hawkwind members